Part XXII is a compilation of laws pertaining to the constitution of India as a country and the union of states that it is made of.  This part of the constitution contains Articles on short title, date of commencement, Authoritative text in Hindi and Repeals.

393.  This Constitution may be called the Constitution of India.

Article 394
Commencement. 

This article tells that some provisions commenced earlier (that are 5, 6, 7, 8, 9, 60, 324, 366, 367, 379, 380, 388, 391, 392 and 393 itself) than the rest of constitution which was commenced on 26 Jan 1950.

Article 394A
Authoritative text in the Hindi language.

Article 395
Repeals.

References

Sources

Part XXII text from wikisource

Part 22